Abdi Garad or Qayaad Full Name: ’Abdi Shirshore Habarwa Abdullah Muse Said Saleh Abdi Mohamed Abdirahman bin Isma'il al-Jabarti  is a sub-clan that is part of the Dulbahante clan-family.

The nickname "Qayaad" was supposedly the name of a Galla chief who formerly controlled the clan's territory and whom the clan's forefather killed in battle.

Prominent Somalis  from this clan include Army Officer Business Man (( Mohamed M. Khaawi)) Mohamed Hashi the former president Puntland, Chief Caaqil Mohamed Saleebaan Shabbac(Afwaranle), Mohamed Samakab (Ganaje),   Mohamoud Diriye Abdi Joof and Ahmed Gacmayare.

Distribution
In Somalia the majority of the clan reside in the Sool region while they have a significant presence in Jubaland in the south. In Ethiopia clan settles in Somali region. The Qayaad inhabit Dharkayn Genyo, kalad, Domco, Dhummay and Dabataag towns in Somalia and Ethiopia. Las Anod the regional capital of Sool is also hosts a large section of the clan.

Clan Tree

The following is a break down of the main sub-clans of Qayaad. 
Abdirahman bin Isma'il al-Jabarti (Darod)
 Mohamed Abdirahman (Kabalalah)
 Abdi Mohamed (Kombe)
Salah Abdi (Harti)
Said Abdi (Dhulbahante)
Muse Said
Abdale Muse
Habarwa Abdale
Shirshore Habarwa
Abdi 'Garad' Shirshore (qayaad)
Omar Abdi
Khayr Abdi 
Ibrahim Khayr
Osman Khayr
Ali Khayr
Wa'eys khayr
Osman Wa'eys
Suban Osman
Ali Osman
Aweer Ali
Nuuh 'dhuub' Ali
Khayr 'Mamece' Ali
Ahmed Ali
Ibrahim Ahmed
Samatar Ahmed
Sharmarke Ahmed 
Warsame Sharmarke 
Hersi Sharmarke
Wa'eys Sharmarke
Fiqi Sharmarke
Eman Sharmarke 
Samakaab Sharmarke   
Yusuf Samakab (Bah Halan)
Abdulle Samakab (Bah Halan)
Dhabar Samakab (Bah Halan)
Hassan Samakab (Bah Lagmadow)
Ismail Samakab (Bah Lagmadow)
Nuur Samakab (Bihina Dalal)
Hersi Samakab (Bihina Dalal)
Hamud Samakab (Bihina Dalal)
Shirwa Samakab (Bihina Dalal)
Mohamoud Samakab (Bah Ogaden)
Abdi Samakab (Bah Ogaden)
Shabeel Samakab (Bah Asila)
Koshin Samakab (Bah Asila)
Samatar Samakab (Bah Asila)
Mohamed Samakab (Bah Asila)

References

Hunt, John A. (1951). "Chapter IX: Tribes and Their Stock". A General Survey of the Somaliland Protectorate 1944–1950.
 London: Crown Agent for the Colonies. Accessed on October 7, 2005 (from Civic Webs Virtual Library archive).
Lewis, I.M. (1955). Peoples of the Horn of Africa: Somali, Afar, and Saho, Part 1, *London: International African Institute.
Lewis, I. M. (1961). A pastoral democracy: a study of pastoralism and politics among the Northern Somali of the Horn of Africa, reed. Münster: LIT Verlag, 1999.
"The Somali Ethnic Group and Clan System". Civic Webs Virtual Library, from: Reunification of the Somali People by Jack L. Davies, Band 160 IEE Working Papers, Institute of Development Research and Development, Ruhr-Universität Bochum, Bochum, Germany 1996, ISBN 3-927276-46-4, ISSN 0934-6058. Retrieved January 22, 2006.

Somali clans
Somali clans in Ethiopia